Purabsarai railway station (station code PBS) was the railway station serving the Munger–Jamalpur twin cities in the Munger district in the Indian state of Bihar. Jamalpur Junction is the main rail head for the Munger city while Purabsarai railway station act as suburban railway station connecting Jamalpur to the city. As of November 2016, no trains are scheduled here. It has one platform.

See also 
 Jamalpur
 Munger

References

Railway stations in Munger district
Railway junction stations in India
Asansol railway division